Iryna Kompaniiets (born 21 November 1993) is a Ukrainian handballer who plays as a left back for IUVENTA Michalovce  and the Ukrainian national team.

Achievements  
WHIL: 
Winner: 2019

References

1993 births
Living people
Sportspeople from Kryvyi Rih
Ukrainian female handball players
Expatriate handball players
Ukrainian expatriate sportspeople in Slovakia